The following Confederate Army units and commanders fought in the Battle of Arkansas Post (otherwise known as Battle of Fort Hindman) of the American Civil War. The Union order of battle is listed separately.

Abbreviations used

Military rank
 BG = Brigadier General
 Col = Colonel
 Ltc = Lieutenant Colonel
 Maj = Major
 Cpt = Captain

Fort Hindman
BG Thomas J. Churchill

See also

 List of Arkansas Civil War Confederate units
 Lists of American Civil War Regiments by State
 Confederate Units by State
 Arkansas in the American Civil War
 Arkansas Militia in the Civil War

Notes

References

 Johnson, Robert Underswood & Clarence Clough Buell (eds.).  Battles and Leaders of the Civil War (New York:  The Century Company), 1884.

External links
 Community & Conflict:  The Impact of the Civil War In the Ozarks
 Edward G. Gerdes Civil War Home Page
 The Encyclopedia of Arkansas History and Culture
 The War of the Rebellion: a Compilation of the Official Records of the Union and Confederate Armies
 The Arkansas History Commission, State Archives, Civil War in Arkansas

1863 in Arkansas
American Civil War orders of battle
Arkansas in the American Civil War